Apatema apolausticum is a moth of the family Autostichidae. It is found in Italy, Slovakia, Croatia, Albania, Hungary, Romania, Bulgaria and Greece.

The wingspan is about 10 mm.

References

Images representing Apatema apolausticum at Consortium for the Barcode of Life

Moths described in 1996
Apatema
Moths of Europe